Alone in the Dark: Illumination is a 2015 third-person shooter video game developed by Atari SA, and the sixth installment of the survival horror video game series under the same title. It is also the last title in the series to be published by Atari as the IP has since been acquired by THQ Nordic. The game was developed by Pure FPS for Windows and is the series' first installment to be played online and in a cooperative setting.

Gameplay
The game is an up-to-four-player cooperative experience with four distinct player characters working together to solve a mystery in an action-horror setting. Some characters wield firearms whereas others use magical abilities. Players make their way through levels with randomly generated elements such as enemy locations, locked doors, or even room layouts to make their way to a safety vault at the end of the level. Throughout it, the players will have to fight off various types of enemies by means of firepower and creating light-sources to defeat them.

Plot
The game brings players to the abandoned town of Lorwich, Virginia. Located near Virginia's southern border, Lorwich was a flourishing industrial town with a bustling business generated by the local coal mines. Those prosperous days came to an end when a flood devastated the mining facility, leaving behind nothing but destruction in its wake. The disaster forced an immediate evacuation, leaving the town desolate. It has been years since the accident, and the town has long been forgotten.

The cause of the accident is still a mystery and, years later, nobody dares to step a foot in the town for fear of what lies there. There have been numerous reports of strange creatures and a dark, brooding fog within the town. Some locals who believe in the supernatural say that there lurks an ever-present force known as The Darkness. The Darkness is said to envelop everything in its path and can reveal itself in many ways, such as fog, apparitions, and creatures.

Characters
There are four player characters:
 Theodore "Ted" Carnby (The Hunter) is a direct descendant of Edward Carnby, the male protagonist of the original Alone in the Dark and three of the sequels. He is actually implied to be the original Edward Carnby living under an assumed identity, still alive in the modern era due to the events of the 2008 Alone in the Dark game. He carries 3 automatic weapons as his primary weapons, namely an AK-47, M4, and P90. He also has a flamethrower attached to each primary weapon that can be used to burn enemies, making them vulnerable to damage. His secondary weapon is a pair of revolvers, which fire more slowly than the other characters' secondary weapons.
 Celeste, born Sara Hartwood (The Witch) is the great-granddaughter of Emily Hartwood, the female protagonist of the original game. She is a member of a coven of witches, who has come to Lorwich searching for 3 of her missing comrades. She fights with a pistol as well as a number of magical abilities, such as throwing a bolt of lightning, enchanting light sources so that they burn nearby enemies, and firing a wave of electricity that travels along the ground. She can also release an area-of-effect electrical burst that deals moderate damage and will activate any nearby electrical light sources.
 Gabriella Saunders (The Engineer) is a new character with no connection to previous games. She is a young woman who has come to Lorwich searching for her missing miner father. Besides her pistol sidearm, her primary weapons are a double-barreled shotgun, a tesla coil device that can be placed on the ground to damage nearby enemies, and a throwing disc that can be triggered to explode. She can also repair electrical light sources after they shut down.
 Father Henry Giger (The Priest) is another new character with no connection to prior characters in the series. He is a Catholic priest who has been sent by the Vatican to investigate the town of Lorwich. He dual-wields a pair of pistols, and can also use a number of holy abilities, such as firing an energy-imbued bullet that stuns an enemy and turns it into a light source, summoning a beam of light from the sky which explodes, and creating a fiery explosion around himself. His melee attacks also set enemies on fire and leave them vulnerable to damage.

Development
The game was in development by Pure FPS under the name Alone in the Dark for an indeterminate time. Originally prepared for announcement in May 2014, the announcement was delayed until August 20, during PAX East of the same year. The official YouTube channel suggested that the original name for the game would have been Alone in the Dark: Online before settling on the final title. The game entered a closed alpha test in mid-August and entered beta later in fall. Beta access was available for a limited time to players who pre-ordered the title from select retailers. The game was released on June 11, 2015. The 'Summer Update 2016' introduced updates to the objective system, player abilities & progression, monster behavior and voiceover for all narrative text.

Reception

The game was panned heavily.

Alone in the Dark: Illumination received "universally negative reviews", according to review aggregator Metacritic.

Hooked Gamers rated it a 1.5 out of 10, stating "Alone in the Dark is dead, and now fans share the task of burying it away and trying to retain the good memories. Alone In The Dark: Illumination comes across as trying to be a Left 4 Dead 2 and Resident Evil 6 hybrid while doing absolutely nothing right, and favoring to do everything wrong."

References

External links

 

2015 video games
Atari games
Alone in the Dark
Cooperative video games
2010s horror video games
Multiplayer and single-player video games
Survival video games
Unreal Engine games
Video game sequels
Video games developed in the United States
Video games featuring female protagonists
Video games set in Virginia
Windows games
Windows-only games
Video games about witchcraft
Third-person shooters